Ringstead is a village and civil parish in the north-west corner of the English county of Norfolk.
For the purposes of local government, it falls within the district of King's Lynn and West Norfolk.

Name
The villages name means 'Ring place'. perhaps referring to a stone circle or circular/round topographical feature.

The village is referred to as Ringstead by the Ordnance Survey. The longer form of the name is Great Ringstead, which is preferred by the parish council. Historically, this was to distinguish the village from the neighbouring deserted medieval village of Barrett Ringstead, also known as Little Ringstead or Rinstead Parva. This was just to the west, and is now in the parish of Old Hunstanton.

Churches
The village had two parishes in the Middle Ages, which were consolidated in 1771 and so one church was abandoned. The surviving church is dedicated to St Andrew, and has a 13th century tower, 14th century nave and a 15th century chancel. There was a major restoration in 1865, which involved the partial rebuilding of the tower and chancel east wall, as well as the addition of a south aisle and porch.

The other church was dedicated to St Peter. Apart from its late 11th century round tower, it was demolished in 1772 but the tower survives in a private garden at the end of Hall Lane, near Ringstead Bury House.

The lost village of Little Ringstead had a church dedicated to St Andrew, which survives as a roofless ruin in an arable field to the west of Downs Farm. The remains have a rectangular plan, are 13th century and might comprise the chancel of a larger church. The village was depopulated by plague in 1349, but the church continued as a private chapel until it was converted into a barn in the 17th century. The ruined Chapel of St Andrew is Grade II* listed.

Notable buildings
Apart from the two churches, Ringstead has fourteen other listed buildings. These comprise the farmhouses at Bluestone, East End and Geddings Farms; the War Memorial; the Gin Trap Inn (the 17th century village pub), the village windmill, the Ringstead Gallery, 22–26 High Street and residences called Old Rectory, Ringstead Bury House, Ringstead Bury Stables, Rose Cottage, The Lodge and The White House.

Downs
The Ringstead Downs comprise a partly wooded chalk ridge to the south-west of the village, and is important for it unimproved chalk grassland. A permissive footpath runs through it and links Ringstead to the nearby resort town of Hunstanton.

Transport
The village is isolated. Although country lanes radiate to neighbouring villages, there is no A or B road, no direct route to the nearest town of Hunstanton and no public transport.

There has been no bus service since the shutdown of the Stagecoach in Norfolk bus company in 2018. Before this, the village was on the route 31 from Fakenham to Hunstanton, allowing for connections to Norwich at the former place and King's Lynn at the latter.

Notable residents
Julian Mond, 3rd Baron Melchett (9 January 1925 – 15 June 1973) – former chairman of British Steel Corporation
Sonia Mond, Sonia Melchett, Baroness Melchett – (6 September 1928; socialite and author
Peter Mond, 4th Baron Melchett – (28 February 1948– 28 August 2018) former Lord in Waiting, Parliamentary Under-Secretary of State and Minister of State

Notes 

http://kepn.nottingham.ac.uk/map/place/Norfolk/Ringstead

External links

St Peter's tower on the European Round Tower Churches website

Villages in Norfolk
King's Lynn and West Norfolk
Civil parishes in Norfolk